I Ka Kené is the seventh album by the Madrid-based group, Dover, released on 4 October 2010. The title means "Are you fine?" in the Bambara language.

The songs were composed between March 2009 and May 2010. The album itself was recorded and produced by Dover in Reno Studios in Madrid between June 7 and July 9, 2010. Five of the songs have been mixed by Chris Lord-Alge (who has worked with blink-182, Paramore and Simple Plan, among others) in Los Angeles, the rest having been mixed by Jesús Antúnez. The album was mastered by Ted Jensen. Dannayá, the first single, was pre-released onto iTunes on July 31.

The 10 songs on the album are sung in a mixture of English, French and Bambara, all together lasting just over 30 minutes in length. In addition to a regular album, Dover have also released a special edition version that will include a vinyl album and a remix of "Dannaya" by Mexican Institute of Sound.

Track listing 
Lyrics and music by Amparo Llanos and Cristina Llanos.

In May 2011, Dover publishes I Ka Kené: The remixes, mostly remixes of "Dannayá", which was popular in some European countries. The album is published only in digital format.

Personnel 
Dover
 Cristina Llanos – Vocals and acoustic guitar
 Amparo Llanos – Guitar
 Samuel Titos – Bass guitar
 Jesús Antúnez – Drums

Charts

References

External links 
 

2010 albums
Dover (band) albums
French-language albums